These are timelines of brain development events in different animal species.

Mouse brain development timeline
Macaque brain development timeline
Human brain development timeline

See also

 Encephalization quotient
 Evolution of the brain
 Neural development

External links
 Translating Neurodevelopmental Time Across Mammalian Species

Vertebrate developmental biology
Embryology of nervous system
Developmental neuroscience